Music & Me is the third studio album by American singer Michael Jackson, released on April 13, 1973 on the Motown label. The album was reissued in 2009 as part of the three-disc compilation Hello World: The Motown Solo Collection.

Background and production
The album was released during a difficult period for Jackson, who was 14 years old at the time, as he had been experiencing vocal changes and facing a changing music landscape. Having been influenced by fellow Motown label mates Marvin Gaye and Stevie Wonder, Jackson wanted to include his own compositions on the album, but Motown refused to allow this. Jackson would later express his frustrations about this to his father, Joe Jackson, who would later work to terminate Michael's and his brothers' contract with Motown, and negotiate lucrative contracts for them with Epic Records.

Since Jackson was on a world tour with his brothers as a member of The Jackson 5, promotion on this album was limited. Two additional songs ("Music and Me" and "Morning Glow") were released as singles in the UK, but they failed to chart. Another track, "Too Young", was released as a single in Italy, while the track "Happy" was a single in Australia and "Doggin' Around" was a limited-release single in the Netherlands. Ten years after this album's release, "Happy" was released as a single in the UK to promote Motown's 18 Greatest Hits compilation album. For the compact disc issues of the album, the text on the album was changed and the shade of green was darker.

Despite featuring a photo of Jackson strumming an acoustic guitar on the album cover, he does not actually play an instrument on the album.

The album was arranged by Dave Blumberg, Freddie Perren, Gene Page and James Anthony Carmichael and is the singer's lowest selling.

Follow-up
After this release, it would take Motown two years to release another Jackson solo album, titled Forever, Michael. A solo album recorded by Jackson soon after Music and Me was shelved following the surprising smash success of the "Dancing Machine" single from the Jackson 5; the album would later be overdubbed and released in 1984 as Farewell My Summer Love, cashing in on the success of the Thriller album. The original mix of the album, along with its 1984 remixes, would be released as part of the Hello World: The Motown Solo Collection in 2009.

Compilation album
Music & Me is sometimes confused with a Michael Jackson compilation album of the same name that Motown Records released on CD in the 1990s. It was originally released in 1982 as Motown Legends: Michael Jackson on vinyl and received a US release in 1985 (also on vinyl). The compilation contained all tracks from the 1973 album (with the exception of "Doggin' Around"), with several more from Jackson's other albums. The CD was not released in the US, but it is available as an import.

Critical reception

The album received favourable reviews from music critics. Ron Wiynn of AllMusic wrote that the album's songs "were undistinguished" and that "Jackson sounded tentative and uninterested vocally" he also wrote that "the production and arrangements were routine at best, sometimes inferior." In his review of the album for The Village Voice, Robert Christgau wrote that "Michael isn't the black Donny Osmond" since he has "a sense of natural rhythm, but he's a singer, not a marionette" but he ended saying that "if [Jackson is] a real interpreter" he doesn't "understand where the interpretations are coming from".

Track listing

The order of tracks 7-9 was changed in later releases. "Johnny Raven" was moved to track 7, "Euphoria" was moved to track 8 and "Morning Glow" was moved to track 9.

Music and Me compilation track listing

 "Rockin' Robin" (from Got to Be There)
 "Johnny Raven"
 "Shoo-Be-Doo-Be-Doo-Da-Day" (from Ben)
 "Happy"
 "Too Young"
 "Up Again"
 "With a Child's Heart"
 "Ain't No Sunshine" (from Got to Be There)
 "Euphoria"
 "Morning Glow"
 "Music and Me"
 "All the Things You Are" (listed as "All the Things You Are, Are Mine")
 "Cinderella Stay Awhile" (from Forever, Michael)
 "We've Got Forever" (from Forever, Michael)

Charts

Sales and certifications

References

External links
 

1973 albums
Albums arranged by Gene Page
Albums produced by Hal Davis
Albums produced by the Mizell Brothers
Michael Jackson albums
Motown albums